The AEW World Tag Team Championship is a professional wrestling world tag team championship created and promoted by the American promotion All Elite Wrestling (AEW). It is a standard tag team championship, being contested by teams of two wrestlers. Established on June 18, 2019, the inaugural champions were SoCal Uncensored (Frankie Kazarian and Scorpio Sky). The current champions are The Gunns (Austin Gunn and Colten Gunn), who are in their first reign, both as a team and individually.

History
On June 18, 2019, six months after the American professional wrestling promotion All Elite Wrestling (AEW) was founded, a tournament was announced to crown the promotion's inaugural tag team champions. That same day, a three-way tag team match for AEW's event Fyter Fest on June 29 was scheduled, featuring Best Friends (Trent? and Chuck Taylor), SoCal Uncensored (Frankie Kazarian and Scorpio Sky), and Private Party (Marq Quen and Isiah Kassidy) with the winning team advancing to All Out for an opportunity at a first round bye in the AEW World Tag Team Championship tournament. Later, AEW's President and Chief Executive Officer Tony Khan announced that the tournament would occur on episodes of their TNT show, later revealed as Dynamite. During the Buy In pre-show of Fyter Fest, Best Friends defeated Private Party and SoCal Uncensored to earn their spot at All Out.

On July 11, AEW's Executive Vice President and wrestler Matt Jackson announced a second three-way tag team match to take place at Fight for the Fallen on July 13 with the winners facing Best Friends at All Out. At Fight for the Fallen, The Dark Order (Evil Uno and Stu Grayson) defeated Jurassic Express (Jungle Boy and Luchasaurus) and Angélico and Jack Evans to advance to All Out. At the event on August 31, The Dark Order defeated Best Friends to receive the first round bye in the tournament.

Inaugural tournament
The first official match of the AEW World Tag Team Championship Tournament was announced on August 9, 2019, with The Young Bucks (Matt Jackson and Nick Jackson) facing Private Party (Marq Quen and Isiah Kassidy) on October 9 during the second episode of Dynamite in Boston, Massachusetts. It was later announced that the semifinals for the tournament would take place on the October 23 episode in Pittsburgh, Pennsylvania, with the finals on the October 30 episode in Charleston, West Virginia. On October 30, SoCal Uncensored (Frankie Kazarian and Scorpio Sky) defeated The Lucha Brothers (Pentagón Jr. and Rey Fénix) in the tournament final to become the inaugural champions.

Reigns

The inaugural champions were SoCal Uncensored (Frankie Kazarian and Scorpio Sky). The Young Bucks (Matt Jackson and Nick Jackson) hold four records with the championship: they have the most reigns at two, both as a team and individually, they are both the longest reigning and shortest reigning champions, with their first reign lasting 302 days while their second reign was 28 days, and they have the longest combined reign at 330 days. Kazarian is the oldest champion at 42 while Jungle Boy is the youngest at 24.

The current champions are The Gunns (Austin Gunn and Colten Gunn), who are in their first reign, both as a team and individually. They defeated The Acclaimed (Anthony Bowens and Max Caster) on Dynamite: Championship Fight Night on February 8, 2023, in El Paso, Texas.

Combined reigns

By team

By wrestler

References

External links
AEW World Tag Team Championship history

2019 introductions
All Elite Wrestling championships
Tag team wrestling championships
World professional wrestling championships